Uberto Mori (28 January 1926 – 6 September 1989) was an Italian layman who served as a lecturer in Bologna and was also an entrepreneur. Mori was also a member of the Third Order of Saint Francis and was known for his simple lifestyle, the purity in which he lived it, and his veneration of Mary.

Mori was declared Venerable in 2014 after Pope Francis recognized that he had lived a life of heroic virtue.

Life
Uberto Mori was born in 1926 in Modena to Mario Mori and Edmea Scabazzi. Due to his father's several posts across the nation he studied in schools in cities such as Florence and Trieste.

His father – a soldier during World War II – fell ill with cancer and it fell to Mori to replace him when he was seventeen. It was at this time that he managed to warn 107 Jewish children to flee the area before the advancing Nazis arrived. His father died on 13 August 1944 as a result of the illness he contracted. After his father died he was exempted from further duties and took the chance to resume his studies. But partisans soon broke into his home to intimidate him. He was almost shot but managed to escape his attackers. He pursued educational interests in Bologna after 1944 while he worked in ceramics in Formigine.

Mori married Gilda Cavedoni on 14 April 1952 and went on to have three children. The eldest child was Mario (b. 1953) and the second was their daughter Maria Teresa (b. 1955). Their next son was due in 1958 but Gilda suffered a miscarriage. In 1961 their final child Maria Manuela was born but she died after a mere thirteen months after birth due to a severe illness contracted.

He graduated on 23 July 1959 with a degree in industrial engineering with honors and became an assistant and later a lecturer in Bologna. He became a professor in the Department of Chemistry and Technology. His entrepreneurial abilities allowed him to establish an institution in 1960 known as the Studio Tecnico Uberto Mori that aimed to replace ceramics. He also established – in 1968 – the Ovens Industrial Plants and another in 1971. To do this he travelled to the United States of America in order to purchase the patent for the things that he would use for his establishment. The success of this business garnered wealth for Mori. It also convinced him that his sole aim was to be praise to the Lord in all circumstances. He later established the Mori Group in 1980 and the broadcaster Antenna Uno.

Mori – in 1958 – met Padre Pio (future saint). Mori and his wife embarked on a pilgrimage to Lourdes in 1963. Mori became a member of the Third Order of Saint Francis on 19 February 1967 and he grew in his devotion to the Blessed Virgin Mary. He became immersed in the Word of God and he allowed for it to shape and inspire all of his choices. He supported hospitals and also established a hostel for Franciscan tertiaries. His spiritual advisor was the Capuchin Servant of God Raffaele Spallanzani who died in 1972.

Mori also founded his own television station so that he could evangelize on air. It was on one such broadcast on 7 April 1987 that he suffered a heart attack. The result of this was that he was left crippled. Despite this he found that the Gospel enlightened him and the rosary supported him during his suffering.

Uberto Mori died during an open-heart operation in Pavia on 6 September 1989.

Beatification process
The beatification process commenced in Modena on 27 August 1997 under Pope John Paul II and the local process that spanned from 6 December 1997 to 29 June 2000 conferred upon him the title of Servant of God. The process was ratified in 2002. The Positio – which documented his life of heroic virtue – was submitted in 2003 to the Congregation for the Causes of Saints in Rome for further evaluation.
Pope Francis approved his life of heroic virtue and proclaimed him to be Venerable on 12 June 2014.

The miracle required for his beatification was investigated and ratified on 18 April 2008.

References

External links
Hagiography Circle
Saints SQPN
Uberto Mori

1926 births
1989 deaths
20th-century venerated Christians
Religious leaders from Modena
Venerated Catholics by Pope Francis
Members of the Third Order of Saint Francis
Businesspeople from Modena